Fernando Henrique do Nascimento Pereira (born 1 June 2001), known as Fernando Henrique, is a Brazilian professional footballer who plays as a defensive midfielder and central midfielder for Cruzeiro.

Club career

Grêmio
Born in São José de Mipibu, Brazil, Fernando Henrique joined the Grêmio's Academy at the age of 16 in 2017, on loan from ABC.

Career statistics

Club

International

Honours
Grêmio
Campeonato Gaúcho: 2021, 2022
Recopa Gaúcha: 2021, 2022

References

External links

Profile at the Grêmio F.B.P.A. website

2001 births
Living people
Brazilian footballers
Association football midfielders
Grêmio Foot-Ball Porto Alegrense players
Cruzeiro Esporte Clube players